Noddack is the name of:

 Ida Noddack, German physicist and wife of Walter Noddack
 Walter Noddack, German physicist and husband of Ida Noddack